is a large-scale public bicycle sharing system in Paris, France and 64 surrounding cities. Launched on 1 January 2018, it replaces the previous successful Vélib' system that was managed by JCDecaux. After many technical issues at launch, the City of Paris has set an ultimatum to fix the service by September 2018 which seemed to work as the system is slowly recovering in January 2019.

See also
 Intermodal passenger transport
 Outline of cycling

References

Projects established in 2018
Community bicycle programs
Cycling in Paris
Transport in Paris
Bicycle sharing in France